= Fried durian =

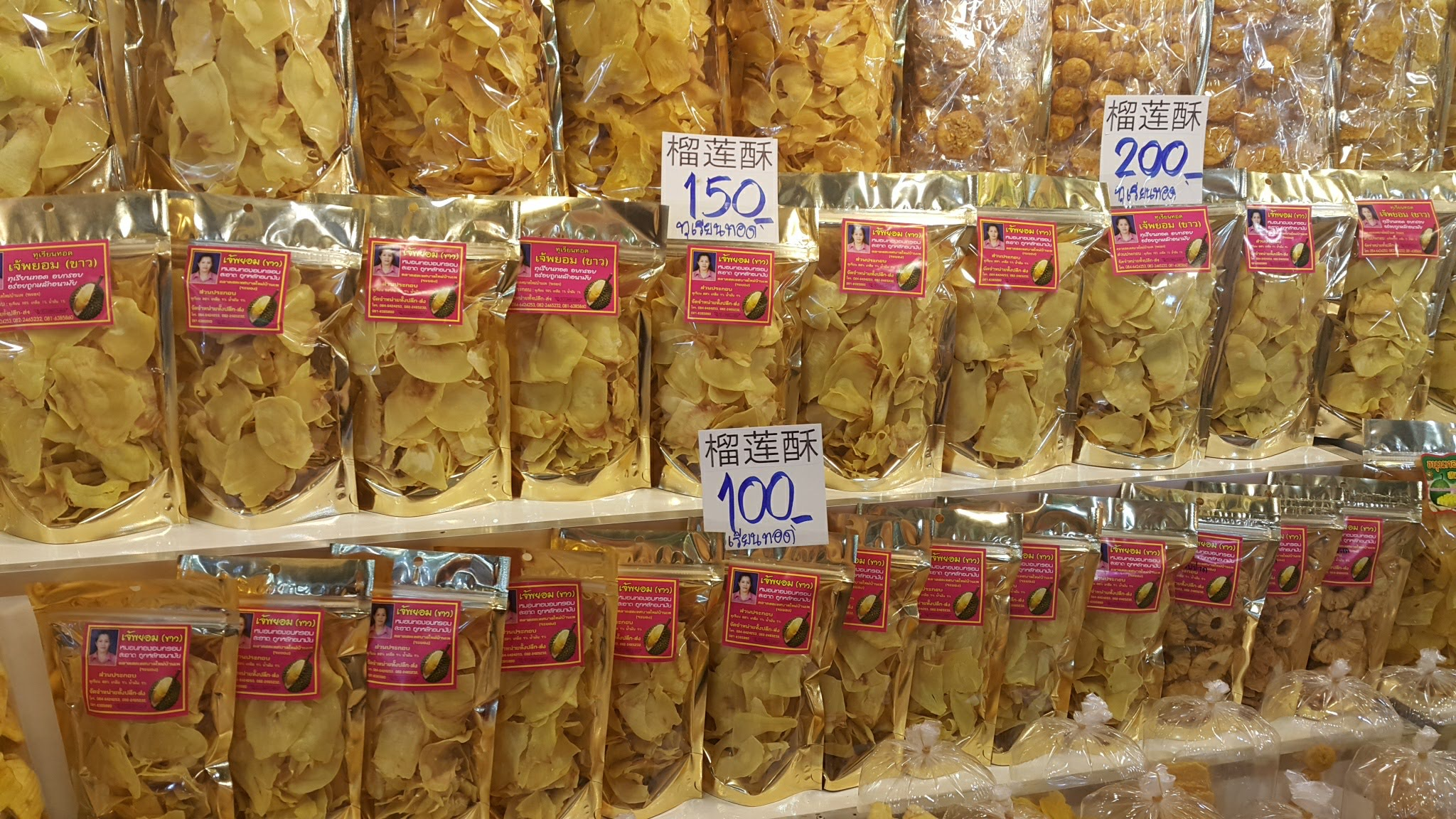
Fried durian on sale in Thailand

Fried durian (Thai: ทุเรียนทอด) is a form of preparation for durian. Today, fried durian consumption is widespread in South East Asian countries such as Thailand and Malaysia. It is available everywhere, especially in souvenir shops nationwide. There are also many products made from fried durian such as crackers with fried durian. Fried durian is a popular food among tourists visiting Thailand.

== History ==
In 1988, agriculturists in Rayong province lost their incomes from durian overflow. Moreover, the increase of worms that pierced durian seeds made durians have a bitter taste and could not be sold as ripe durian. Agricultural authority and local people tried to solve this problem by creating new ways to eat unripe durian. They tested many recipes to make it better and edible for everyone. Finally, they invented fried durian that could retain its sweet taste, nutritional value, with a long shelf life and deodorization. Fried durian started to hit the shelf in 1989 and rapidly gained popularity.
